Laomenes is a genus of shrimp comprising the following species:
Laomenes amboinensis (De Man, 1888) - Ambon crinoid shrimp
Laomenes ceratophthalmus (Borradaile, 1915)
Laomenes clarki (Marin, 2009)
Laomenes cornutus (Borradaile, 1915)
Laomenes holthuisi (Marin & Okuno, 2010)
Laomenes jackhintoni (Bruce, 2006)
Laomenes nudirostris (Bruce, 1968)
Laomenes pardus (Marin, 2009)
Laomenes tigris (Marin, 2009) - tiger crinoid shrimp

References

Palaemonoidea